Foster is a small unincorporated community in Mound Township, Warren County, in the U.S. state of Indiana.

History
Foster was platted April 25, 1893 on land donated by William R. Foster, an early settler.  At one time the town had a post office, blacksmith shop, railroad depot, two stores, a stockyard, a threshing machine, a grain elevator and a sawmill. Currently it consists of a few private residences, a couple of small shops and a motel.

A post office was established at Foster in 1883, and remained in operation until it was discontinued in 1905.

Geography
The Vermilion Valley Railroad (originally the New York Central Railroad) passes through Fowler, and the north fork of Spring Creek flows along its western edge.

Demographics

References

Unincorporated communities in Indiana
Unincorporated communities in Warren County, Indiana
Populated places established in 1893